Dodson may refer to:

Places

United States
 Dodson, Louisiana
 Dodson, Montana
 Dodson, Ohio
 Dodson, Oregon
 Dodson, Texas
 Dodson Township, Highland County, Ohio

Elsewhere
 Dodson Peninsula, Antarctica
 Dodson Valley, a town in Nelson, New Zealand

People
 Akeem Dodson, American cricketer
 Antoine Dodson, American internet celebrity
 Betty Dodson (1929–2020), American sex educator
 Calaway H. Dodson, American botanist
 Fitzhugh Dodson, American clinical psychologist, lecturer, educator and author
 Harry Dodson, English gardener and television personality
 Jack Dodson, American television actor
 James Dodson (mathematician) (1705–1757), British mathematician
 Jeff Dodson, American college baseball coach
 John George Dodson, 1st Baron Monk Bretton (1825–1897), British Liberal politician
 Major Dodson, American actor
 Mick Dodson, Indigenous Australian leader
 Owen Dodson, African-American poet, novelist, and playwright
 Pat Dodson (baseball), former first baseman with the Boston Red Sox
 Pat Dodson, Indigenous Australian leader, brother of Mick Dodson
 Peter Dodson, American paleontologist
 Rachel Dodson, American comic book inker and colorist
 Sarah Paxton Ball Dodson (1847–1906), American painter
 Stephen Dodson Ramseur (1837-1864), American Civil War general
 Terry Dodson, American comic book artist
 Tyrel Dodson (born 1998), American football player

See also 
 
 Dotson, a surname
 Dodgson, a surname
 Dodgeson, a 1926 American automobile